The Coin Act 1732 (6 Geo. 2 c. 26) was an Act of the Parliament of Great Britain which made it high treason to counterfeit gold coins. Its title was "An Act to prevent the coining or counterfeiting any of the gold coins commonly called Broad Pieces."

Broad Pieces were gold coins in denominations of 23 or 25 shillings. A royal proclamation in February 1732 had prohibited people from giving or receiving in payment Broad Pieces, or halves or quarters of them, and had required revenue collectors to collect them in order that they could be melted down and made into new gold coins. To encourage people to surrender their coins, the revenue collectors were authorised to purchase them at favourable rates, which unintentionally created an incentive for people to counterfeit them. Accordingly, an Act of Parliament was passed which made it treason to counterfeit them, or to "utter or vend any of the said gold coins, knowing them to be so forged, coounterfeited or coined as aforesaid." There was a £40 reward for anyone whose information led to someone being convicted of treason under the Act, and any convicted traitor was to be automatically pardoned if he informed on somebody else and the person informed on was convicted.

The Act required prosecutions for this kind of treason to begin within six months of the offence. The penalty was death, but there was to be no corruption of blood. The rules of evidence and procedure were to be the same as in other cases of counterfeiting coins.

Notes

See also
High treason in the United Kingdom
Coin Acts 1572 and 1575
Coin Act 1696
Counterfeiting Coin Act 1741
Treason Act

Great Britain Acts of Parliament 1732
Treason in the United Kingdom
Currency law in the United Kingdom